Çuxuryurd or Chukhuryurt or Chukhur”yurt or Chukhuryurd may refer to:
Çuxuryurd, Agsu, Azerbaijan
Çuxuryurd, Shamakhi, Azerbaijan